Michaela McAreavey, née Harte (Irish: Micheáilín Mhic Giolla Riabhaigh née Ní hÁirt, 31 December 1983 – 10 January 2011) was found strangled in the bath of a hotel room in Mauritius, where she had travelled for her honeymoon. The daughter of Tyrone's multiple All-Ireland Senior Football Championship-winning Gaelic football manager Mickey Harte, her death and subsequent events prompted continuing widespread international media coverage.

It was the first murder of a tourist in Mauritius, and the Mauritian Prime Minister Navin Ramgoolam expressed his sympathy to the Harte and McAreavey families. The two hotel workers who were accused of her murder were tried and declared not-guilty by the Supreme Court of Mauritius: they were acquitted on 12 July 2012.

Victim
Michaela McAreavey, born Michaela Harte, was a 27-year-old Irish teacher from Glencull (Ballygawley, County Tyrone, Northern Ireland) and the daughter of Tyrone Gaelic football team manager Mickey Harte. She had been the Ulster Rose at the 2004 Rose of Tralee.

McAreavey was Catholic and a Pioneer and was seen to be religious. She taught Irish and Religion at St Patrick's Academy, Dungannon, where she ran the "Pioneer Club" encouraging young people to abstain from alcohol.

Murder
On 10 January 2011, McAreavey and her husband John had lunch at their hotel in Grand Gaube. After lunch, at about 2:44 PM, she went to her room. Investigators believe she was wrestled to the ground on entering her room and strangled. She was put into the bath and the water was turned on. Her body was discovered by her husband soon after.

Investigation
Three employees of the hotel were later arrested for the murder: Avinash Treebhoowoon, Sandeep Moonea and Raj Theekoy. They appeared in court in Mauritius on 12 January 2011. Treebhoowoon and Mooneea were charged with McAreavey's murder and Theekoy with conspiracy to murder. DNA tests were taken on the suspects. Dassen Narayen and Seenarain Mungoo were arrested the following week and charged with aiding and abetting a crime. Narayen and Mungoo were both security officers at the hotel. Mungoo was released and had all charges against him dropped on 12 February 2011. Narayen was also cleared; his fingerprints had been found on a towel in the room because he had given it to her husband when he called for help upon finding her body.

Funeral
McAreavey was brought home and a traditional Irish wake was held. Attendees included Cardinal Edward Daly; 1992 All-Ireland winning manager Brian McEniff; GAA President Christy Cooney, Northern Ireland's First Minister and deputy First Ministers, the Democratic Unionist Peter Robinson and Sinn Féin's Martin McGuinness; sports minister Nelson McCausland, enterprise minister Arlene Foster and justice committee chairman Maurice Morrow.

McAreavey's funeral, which took place on 17 January 2011 at the same church where she had been married less than a month earlier, (St Malachy's, Ballymacilroy), was attended by thousands of mourners, including then President of Ireland Mary McAleese and Northern Ireland's First Minister and deputy First Minister Peter Robinson and Martin McGuinness respectively. Mourners from both nationalist and unionist communities paid their respects and offered condolences. A special Mass was held simultaneously in Mauritius, led by the island's senior priest, Father Philippe Goupille.

Trial
The trial of two hotel workers for the murder began in Mauritius on 22 May 2012.

On 6 June 2012, John McAreavey said he had been handcuffed by police officers and they examined his body for marks on the day of his wife's murder. He also said that he had seen one of the accused (Avinash Treebhoowoon) on two occasions within a few minutes the day his wife died. McAreavey said that he had gone back to the hotel room looking for his wife when she failed to return to the restaurant after leaving him to get some biscuits from their room to eat with their cups of tea. He found her unconscious in the bath with the tap running, and laid her on the floor and then tried to revive her. A DNA test made by a forensic expert from England found that no DNA traces of the two men accused or of  the other two original suspects were present on the body or at the crime scene.

The Major Crime Investigation Team (MCIT) of Mauritius Police Force faced severe criticism for its handling of the case and for claims by Treebhoowoon, who alleged that police beat a confession out of him, since he was subjected to three days of beatings by officers before he confessed that he strangled McAreaey because she caught him and co-defendant Sandeep Moonea stealing from her hotel room.

Verdict
On 12 July 2012, Judge Prithviraj Fekna told the jurors not to worry about the effect of any verdict on the reputation of Mauritius. He reminded the six men and three women that they were not politicians and it was not their job to protect the image of the country. "You have been told that this will have an international ramification and will affect the image of Mauritius… this is not your role," Fekna said. "You must not allow yourself to be influenced by this, you are not politicians, you have to base yourself on what has happened."

The case was originally scheduled to run for nine days, but the verdict came in its eighth week. After two hours of deliberation, the jury returned a unanimous verdict, finding Avinash Treebhoowoon and Sandeep Moonea not guilty. In a statement released after the verdict, the McAreavey and Harte families said that following the endurance of "seven harrowing weeks of this trial" there were no words to describe "the sense of devastation and desolation now felt by both families".

Lawyers representing Treebhoowoon and Moonea called for all evidence in the case to be given to non-Mauritian investigators, describing Mauritius's MCIT as "incompetent".

Aftermath
Following the verdict, the Mauritian government issued a statement: "The government and the people of Mauritius understand and continue to share the grief and agony of the Harte and McAreavey families, the Government is considering all options concerning further action in this matter, with a view to bringing the perpetrators of this heinous crime to justice."

Some Irish people started an internet campaign calling for a boycott of the Mauritian tourism sector, one of the main pillars of the island's economy. Irish politician Seán Kelly supported the campaign by saying: "No justice for Michaela McAreavey in Mauritius. It is a massive indictment of Mauritius authorities’ incompetence. No Irish should visit Mauritius yet until justice is done." Calls for a boycott intensified following the events of 15 July 2012.

On 15 July 2012, a new Mauritian newspaper called Sunday Times published photographs of the hotel room crime scene, including images of McAreavey's body in its 35th edition. The front page featured a photograph of the body under the headline "Exclusive". A spokesperson for the Harte and McAreavey families said: “As the families struggle to come [to terms] with the result from the trial - this action by the newspaper is not only insensitive to their grief, but marks another low in the treatment of John, the two families and the dignity of Michaela.”

Reacting to the publication, Taoiseach Enda Kenny stated: "On behalf of the people of Ireland, the Government will be lodging a formal complaint in the strongest possible terms, with the government of Mauritius". The McAreavey family lawyer in Mauritius, Dick Ng Sui Wa, called for the perpetrator to be arrested and asked for a full inquiry from the Commission of Police in Mauritius. Mauritian police launched an inquiry into how the newspaper published the photographs. Police officers raided the offices of the newspaper on the morning of 16 July 2012, but found no photographs. On 18 July 2012, the newspaper's editor and director general, Imran Hosany, was arrested. Later that day, he appeared in court charged with facts related to the publication of the photographs, and was released on bail. The Press Employees Union in Mauritius (USEP) issued a statement in support of Hosany: "Both the local press and international news agencies regularly show pictures of murder, bloodied demonstrators, corpses of people killed or injured in conflict areas, among others, The USEP considers that the treatment suffered by the editor of the Sunday Times in the hands of the Mauritius Police is disproportionate to the offences charged."

A new investigation team was set up in August 2012 to start an inquiry. Thirty-eight people were interviewed, 68 witnesses participated in a reconstruction of the circumstances of the murder and 350 DNA samples were sent to a laboratory in France. On 27 December 2012, the police submitted a report to the Director of Public Prosecutions (DPP) in which a suspect was named.

In August 2015, after lodging a case against the Legends Hotel, John McAreavey and his relatives received nearly 65 million rupees (equivalent to about £1.6 million pounds sterling). McAreavey's legal representative, Dick Ng Sui Wa, said that the two parties had reached the confidential settlement through mediation.

In November 2015, John McAreavey married again to Tara Brennan with the blessing of the Harte family. In August 2020, he reported that the Mauritian government had said it had launched a new inquiry into his wife's death, though he questioned its timing, since it coincided with his criticism of Liverpool FC’s new commercial partnership with Mauritius. In June 2021, the Mauritian government agreed to re-examine the murder investigation.

On 1 October 2021, star witness and former suspect Raj Theekoy was reported to be missing. On 3 October 2021, his body was found on a vacant plot of land at Beau Plateau, near Goodlands. Although it was rumoured that he committed suicide by hanging, police officers from the Scene of Crime Office (SOCO) were carrying out further investigation.

The MCIT arrested 39-year old former watchman Dassen Narayen again on 29 March 2022, after new evidence emerged. Charges against Narayen had previously been dropped in 2013 after he had claimed to have been tortured by police.

During a press conference held in April 2022 the lawyers of suspect Sandeep Moonea stated that John McAreavey should be considered the main suspect. Lawyers Ravi Rutnah, Neelkanth Dulloo and Sanjeev Teeluckdharry planned to request an arrest warrant against him to enable further questioning.

On 3 June 2022, a video emerged on social media showing a group of Loyalists singing a song that mocked McAreavey's death. The video in question had been filmed in a room decorated with union flags and Orange Order paintings, and was universally condemned by politicians in Northern Ireland as sectarian. Two of the men who had appeared in the video, Andrew McDade and John Bell, issued a joint apology for their actions through JWB Consultancy, a company owned by the Loyalist campaigner Jamie Bryson, and Bell's employment as a coach at the football club Linfield United was terminated "with immediate effect".

See also
 Match for Michaela

References

External links
 New police team will take over the investigation into the murder of Michaela McAreavey - KotZot
 "Who are we to lecture people of Mauritius about justice?" - The Irish Times
 Dr Sean Carey: "Publication of Michaela McAreavey crime scene pictures presents a significant problem for Mauritius" - Analysis of the social and cultural context of Mauritius using insights from social anthropology in The Independent

2010s murders in Mauritius
2011 crimes in Mauritius
2011 in Northern Ireland
2011 murders in Africa
Deaths by strangulation
Female murder victims
 
Murder in Mauritius
Unsolved murders in Africa
Violence against women in Mauritius